The Uyghurs of Turkey are members of the Uyghur diaspora that live in Turkey.

History
There is a long history of the connection between the Turkish people and the Uyghurs. Both groups speak a Turkic language and the two groups share significant ethnic and cultural bonds. 

With Turkey being a Turkic country, the Uyghurs have been largely able to integrate within Turkish society. Turkey has been the home of a sizable Uyghur population in the Middle East fleeing from the Xinjiang conflict. Often Uyghurs who wished to migrate to Europe and the United States often choose Turkey as the transit point. Turkey has been concerned by the Uyghur situation, although it had been criticized for being helpless.

Since the Syrian Civil War, Uyghurs have participated in several jihadist battalion groups, some of which are believed to have connections with the Turkish government. Uyghurs in Turkey have partly contributed to them, notably the Turkistan Islamic Party in Syria. In 2017, Reuters reported that exiles and human rights groups stated that Uyghurs had escaped Chinese human rights abuses by fleeing to Turkey. At that time, the Syrian Ambassador to China had stated that up to 5,000 Uyghurs were fighting in the Syrian Civil war, citing Syrian statistics on casualties and prisoners of war captured by Syria. The ambassador said that most Uyghur fighters in the region had been fighting "under their own banner" of separatism, though he stated that a minority had fought with ISIL.

Demographics
The estimate for the number of Uyghurs living Turkey varies across sources. In 2018, The Economist reported that over 10,000 Uyghurs live in Turkey. Voice of America estimated over 200,000 Uyghurs live in Turkey, based from Uyghur advocating groups, with 150,000 as refugees. In 2021, Tokyo-based English language online news magazine Nikkei Asia and online news publication Coda Story reported that 200,000 Uyghurs lived in Turkey, with Nikkei Asia reporting that the diaspora was "largest outside of Central Asia."

References

Ethnic groups in Turkey
Uyghur diaspora